Koponang Lakan ng Bulacan are a professional basketball currently playing in the Pilipinas Super League (PSL), and in the Maharlika Pilipinas Basketball League (MPBL) and formerly in the Chooks-to-Go Pilipinas 3x3. It was first owned by the Provincial Government of Bulacan, backed by former Bulacan First District Representative Jose Antonio Sy-Alvarado, also known as "Kuya".

The team also goes by Bulacan Kuyas - Baliwag City when the team plays in the MPBL, where the team first played.

History

Maharlika Pilipinas Basketball League 
The Bulacan Kuyas which is owned by Bulacan Congressman Jonathan Sy-Alvarado was among the teams featured in the inaugural season of the Maharlika Pilipinas Basketball League, the 2018 MPBL Anta Rajah Cup. They were also the champions of the pre-season tournament of the MPBL held prior to the tournament.

The team inked a partnership with the Ligo Sardines, a canned sardines brand, for the duration of the 2018 season. Entering the 2018-19 season, the team changed its sponsor and signed a deal with Mighty Sports to become the team's new major sponsor.

Despite making the playoffs in its first three seasons, the team never made past the first round on all three occasions. The team would later take a short hiatus, opting out of the 2022 season before returning in 2023.

Pilipinas Super League 
Bulacan joined the Pilipinas Super League in 2022, going by Koponang Lakan ng Bulacan.

Roster

Head coaches
Ogie Gumatay (2018)
Chris Baluyot (2018)
Britt Reroma (2018–2019)
Kerwin McCoy (2019–2021)
Ralph Emerson Rivera (2021) 
Alvin Grey (2023–present)

Season-by-season records
Records from the 2021 MPBL Invitational:

References

Bulacan Kuyas
2017 establishments in the Philippines
Basketball teams established in 2017